The Bricklieve Mountains or Bricklieve Hills are a range of hills in south County Sligo, Ireland. They are dotted with ancient passage tombs known as the Carrowkeel tombs or Bricklieve tombs. The name of the hills is a possible reference to their appearance when more quartz rock survived outside the cairns, making them sparkle in the sun. The Caves of Kesh are on the west side of Kesh Corran.

References

Mountains and hills of County Sligo